Solanum triflorum is a species of nightshade known by the common names cutleaf nightshade and small nightshade. It is native to Argentina, but it is known on other continents, including Europe and Australia, as an introduced species and sometimes a weed. It is present throughout much of North America, where it is possibly non-native as well. It grows in many types of habitat, including disturbed areas. It is an annual herb producing spreading, decumbent stems up one meter long. It is hairy, the hairs sometimes associated with glands. The leaves are a few centimeters long and are deeply cut into toothlike lobes. The inflorescence bears two or three flowers each just under a centimeter wide when fully open. The flower is usually white, but is occasionally purple-tinged. The fruit is a berry roughly a centimeter wide.

References

External links

Jepson Manual Treatment
Washington Burke Museum
Photo gallery

triflorum
Plants described in 1818